The 2003 European Figure Skating Championships was a senior international figure skating competition in the 2002–03 season. Medals were awarded in the disciplines of men's singles, ladies' singles, pair skating, and ice dancing. The event was held at the Malmö Ice in Malmö, Sweden from January 20 to 26, 2003. The compulsory dance was the Tango Romantica.

Qualifying
The competition was open to skaters from European ISU member nations who had reached the age of 15 before 1 July 2002. The corresponding competition for non-European skaters was the 2003 Four Continents Championships. National associations selected their entries based on their own criteria. Based on the results of the 2002 European Championships, each country was allowed between one and three entries per discipline.

Medals table

Competition notes
Due to the large number of participants, the ladies' qualifying round was split into groups A and B.

Results

Men

Ladies

Pairs

Ice dancing

References

External links
 2003 European Figure Skating Championships
The event at SVT's open archive 

European Figure Skating Championships, 2003
European Figure Skating Championships
European Figure Skating Championships
Figure skating in Sweden
International figure skating competitions hosted by Sweden
European Figure Skating Championships
International sports competitions in Malmö
European Figure Skating Championships, 2003